Germany–Russia relations display cyclical patterns, moving back and forth from cooperation and alliance to strain and to total warfare. Historian John Wheeler-Bennett says that since the 1740s:
Relations between Russia and Germany...have been a series of alienations,  distinguished for their bitterness, and of rapprochements, remarkable for their warmth....A cardinal factor in the relationship has been the existence of an independent Poland...when separated by a buffer state the two great Powers of eastern Europe have  been friendly, whereas a contiguity of frontiers has bred hostility.

Otto von Bismarck established the League of the Three Emperors in 1873 with Russia, Germany, and Austria-Hungary. But after Bismarck's dismissal in 1890, his successors chose to support Austria against Russia over competing influence in the Balkans. Germany fought against Russia in World War I (1914–1918). Relations were warm in the 1920s, very cold in the 1930s, friendly in 1939–41, and then turned into war to the death in 1941–45. In the 1920s both countries co-operated with each other in trade and (secretly) in military affairs.  Hostilities escalated in the 1930s as the Fascists sponsored by Berlin and the Communists sponsored by Moscow fought each other across the world, most famously in the Spanish Civil War (1936–39).  In a stunning turnabout in August 1939, both countries came to an agreement, and divided up the previously independent nations of Eastern Europe. That détente collapsed in 1941 when Germany invaded the USSR. The Soviets survived however and formed an alliance with Britain and the U.S., and pushed the Germans back, capturing Berlin in May 1945.

During the Cold War 1947–1991, Germany was divided, with East Germany under Communist control and under the close watch of Moscow, which stationed a large military force there and repressed an uprising in 1953.  Since the end of the Cold War and German reunification, in 1989–91, Germany and Russia have developed a "Strategic Partnership" in which energy is indisputably one of the most important factors. Germany and Russia depend on each other for energy, namely in Germany's need for energy from Russia and Russia's need for heavy German investment to develop its energy infrastructure.

According to a 2014 BBC World Service poll, only 21% of Germans view Russia's influence positively, which is on a par with the United States of America. Russians, however, have a much more positive view of Germany than Germans do of Russia, with 57% viewing Germany's influence positively and 12% negatively.

Relations turned highly negative in 2014 in response to Russia's seizure of Crimea from Ukraine and support for insurgents in Ukraine.  Germany was a leader between NATO Quint in imposing round after round of increasingly harsh European Union sanctions against the Russian oil and banking industries and top allies of President Vladimir Putin. Russia responded by cutting food imports from the EU.

The 2022 Russian invasion of Ukraine led to a near complete reversal of German-Russian relations with the new German Chancellor, Olaf Scholz, "ordering" the immediate transfer of thousands of missiles to the Ukrainian military to aid in its fight against the invading Russian forces. Germany has also participated in severe economic banking sanctions against Russia since the start of the war. However, Germany is very dependent on Russia for natural gas and has been less willing to sanction this sector, aside from halting the Nord Stream 2 gas pipeline and the attack on September 26 temporarily shutting the pipes down. The pipeline made up a significant portion of Germany's petroleum imports from Russia. In response to sanctions imposed by Germany and the West, Russia gradually plunged flows of gas, which came to a complete halt in September 2022.

History

Early history

The earliest contact between Germans and East Slavs is unknown, though evidence of  East Germanic loan-words suggest Slavic interactions with the Goths.  Substantive historically recorded contact goes back to the times of the  Teutonic Knights' campaigns in the  Baltic, where the Knights  took control of the land in the 13th century CE. Prince Alexander Nevsky defeated the Teutonic Knights at the Battle of the Ice in 1242.

Russia before the mid-18th century stood largely aloof from German affairs, while Germany, until the Napoleonic period, remained divided into numerous small states under the nominal leadership of the Holy Roman Emperor.

After Russia's Great Northern War of 1700-1721 against  Sweden, however, Russia's influence spread definitively into the Baltic area.

German migrations eastward
Over the centuries, from the Middle Ages onwards, German settlers steadily moved eastward, often into mostly Slavic areas and areas near to or controlled by Russia. Flegel points out that German farmers, traders and entrepreneurs moved into East and West Prussia, the Baltic region (Lithuania, Latvia and Estonia), the Danzig and Vistula River region,  Galicia, Slovenia, the Banat, the Bachka, Bukovina, Transylvania, the Volga River district of Russia,  Posen, the Duchy of Warsaw, Polish and Ukrainian Volhynia, Bessarabia, and the  Mount Ararat region between the 17th and the 20th centuries. Often they came at the invitation of  Russian governments. The Germans typically became the dominant factors in land-owning and in business enterprise. Some groups, such as part of the Mennonites, migrated to North America 1860–1914.  The Germans in the Baltic states returned home voluntarily in 1940. Some 12 to 14 million were brutally expelled from Poland, Czechoslovakia and other countries in Eastern Europe in 1944–46, with the death of 500,000 or more.  When the Cold War ended Germany funded the return of hundreds of thousands of people of German descent, whether or not they spoke German.

A number of Baltic Germans served as ranking generals in the Russian Imperial Army and Navy, including Michael Barclay de Tolly, Adam von Krusenstern, Fabian von Bellingshausen, Friedrich von Buxhoeveden, Paul von Rennenkampf, Ivan Ivanovich Michelson and Eduard Totleben.

Many Baltic Germans (such as Baron Roman von Ungern-Sternberg, Baron Pyotr Nikolayevich Wrangel, Yevgeny Miller, and Anatoly Lieven) sided with the Whites and related anti-Bolshevik forces (like the Baltische Landeswehr and the Freikorps movement) during the Russian Civil War.

Prussia and Russia
With the creation of the Kingdom of Prussia in 1701 and the proclamation of the Russian Empire in 1721, two powerful new states emerged that began to interact.

They fought on opposite sides during the War of the Austrian Succession (1740 – 1748), but the war saw both grow in power. Russia defeated Sweden and Prussia defeated Austria. Russia and Prussia again were at odds during the Seven Years' War (1756–1763) and fought the battles of  Gross-Jägersdorf, Zorndorf, Kay and Kunersdorf.  However, when Russian Tsar Peter III came to power, he made peace with Prussia by signing the Treaty of Saint Petersburg, allowing Prussian King Frederick the Great to concentrate on his other enemies.

Prussia and Russia in agreement with Austria then cooperated to carve up Poland-Lithuania between them in 1772, 1793, and 1795. Poland disappeared from the map.

Both Russia and Prussia had absolute monarchies that reacted sharply when the French Revolution executed the king. They at first were part of the coalition against the new French regime during the French Revolutionary Wars and later the Napoleonic Wars.  During the Napoleonic era (1799 to 1815) Austria, Prussia, and Russia were at one time or another in coalition with Napoleon against his arch-enemy Great Britain. In the end, the two German states of Austria and Prussia united with Russia and Britain in opposing Napoleon. That coalition was primarily a matter of convenience for each nation.  The key matchmaker was the Austrian Chancellor Klemens von Metternich,  who forged a united front that proved decisive in overthrowing Napoleon, 1813–1814.

Russia was the most powerful force on the continent after 1815 and played a major role in the Concert of Europe which included France, Russia, Austria and Britain, but not Prussia. In 1815, the Holy Alliance consisting of Prussia, Russia and Austria was completed in Paris. For forty years (1816–56) Russian-German diplomat Karl Nesselrode as foreign minister guided Russian foreign policy. The revolutions of 1848 did not reach Russia, but its political and economic system was inadequate to maintain a modern army.  It did poorly in the Crimean War.  As Fuller notes, "Russia had been beaten on the Crimean peninsula, and the military feared that it would inevitably be beaten again unless steps were taken to surmount its military weakness." The Crimean War marked the end of the Concert of Europe. Prussia was shaken by the Revolutions of 1848 but was able to withstand the revolutionaries' call to war against Russia.  Prussia did go to war with Denmark, however, and was only stopped by British and Russian pressure. Prussia remained neutral in the Crimean War.

Prussia's successes in the Wars of German Unification in the 1860s were facilitated by Russia's lack of involvement.  The creation of the German Empire under Prussian dominance in 1871, however, greatly changed the relations between the two countries.

The German and Russian Empires

Initially, it seemed as if the two great empires would be strong allies.  German Chancellor Otto von Bismarck formed the  League of the Three Emperors in 1872 binding together Russia, Austria, and Germany. The League stated that republicanism and socialism were common enemies, and that the three powers would discuss any matters concerning foreign policy. Bismarck needed good relations with Russia in order to keep France isolated. In 1877–1878, Russia fought a victorious war with the Ottoman Empire and attempted to impose the Treaty of San Stefano on it. This upset the British in particular, as they were long concerned with preserving the Ottoman Empire and preventing a Russian takeover of the Bosphorus. Germany hosted the Congress of Berlin (1878), whereby a more moderate peace settlement was agreed to. Germany had no direct interest in the Balkans, however, which was largely an Austrian and Russian sphere of influence.

In 1879, Bismarck formed a Dual Alliance of Germany and Austria-Hungary, with the aim of mutual military assistance in the case of an attack from Russia, which was not satisfied with the agreement reached at the Congress of Berlin.  The establishment of the Dual Alliance led Russia to take a more conciliatory stance, and in 1887, the so-called Reinsurance Treaty was signed between Germany and Russia: in it, the two powers agreed on mutual military support in the case that France attacked Germany, or in case of an Austrian attack on Russia.  Russia turned its attention eastward to Asia and remained largely inactive in European politics for the next 25 years.

Germany was somewhat worried about Russia's potential industrialization—it had far more potential soldiers—while Russia feared Germany's already established industrial power.  In 1907 Russia went into a coalition with Britain and France, the Triple Entente.

The ultimate result of this was that Russia and Germany became enemies in World War I. The Eastern Front saw Germany successful, with victories at Tannenberg, First and Second Masurian Lakes and Lake Naroch. The czarist system collapsed in 1917. The Bolsheviks came to power in the October Revolution.  The new regime signed the Treaty of Brest-Litovsk  which was highly advantageous to Germany, although it was reversed when Germany surrendered to the Allies in November 1918.

Interwar period

After the peace treaties that ended the Great War, the newly created states of the Weimar Republic and the Soviet Union both found themselves outcasts in the international system and gravitated toward each other. The Treaty of Rapallo (1922) formalized their warming relationship. Until 1933 the Soviet Union secretly provided training camps for the German Armed Forces.

The coming to power in 1933  of Adolf Hitler and the creation of the Nazi state with its virulent anti-Semitic and anti-communist rhetoric made for extremely hostile propaganda in both directions. Nazi propaganda, across Europe and Latin America, focused on warnings against Jewish and Bolshevik threats emanating from Moscow. The Comintern, representing Moscow's international Communist network,  moved to a popular front approach after 1934, allowing the Communists worldwide to cooperate with socialists, intellectuals and workers  on the left in opposing Fascism. The worldwide left-wing support for the Republicans in the Spanish Civil War (1936–39) proved of enormous aid to the Communist cause. Germany and the Soviets both sent military forces and advisors into Spain, as did Italy.

The Spanish Civil War was in part a proxy war. The Nationalists  led by General Francisco Franco and the Republican government fought it out for the control of the country. Militarily, the Nationalists usually had the upper hand and they won in the end. Germany sent in the Condor Legion comprising elite air and tank units to the  Nationalist forces.  The Soviet Union sent military and political advisors, and sold munitions in support of the "Loyalist," or Republican, side. The Comintern helped Communist parties around the world send volunteers to the International Brigades that fought for the Loyalists.

In August 1939 the two totalitarian states stunned the world by coming to a major agreement, the Molotov–Ribbentrop Pact. They agreed to invade and partition Poland and divided up Eastern Europe. The Soviets provided Germany with oil and reversed the anti-Nazi rhetoric of Communist parties around the world. At the same time, the Soviet and German interests were not reconciled in the Balkano-Danubian region. Thus, during 1940-1941 hot Soviet-German discussions concerning a new division of the South-Eastern Europe were going on. In June 1940, Moscow recognized that Slovakia was in the German sphere of influence. Otherwise, Russian request for the exclusive influence in Romania, Bulgaria and Turkey was rejected by Berlin in November 1940.

German invasion of Soviet Union and World War II

 
In 1941, it was Russia's turn, yet Joseph Stalin refused to believe the multiple warnings of a German invasion.  Operation Barbarossa began in June 1941, captured  or destroyed multiple Soviet armies, and reached the gates of Moscow by December. Stalin fought back and forged close relations with Britain and the United States, both of which provided large amounts of munitions.

The Eastern Front became the horrendous ideological and race war with more than 27 million killed, including Soviet prisoners of war and Jews. It was perhaps the bloodiest conflict in human history.

After the War: the Soviet Union and the Two German States

The defeat of Germany by the Soviets and the Western allies eventually led to the occupation and partition of Germany and the expulsions of most ethnic-Germans from Soviet-conquered areas.

The creation of West Germany and East Germany complicated relations.  West Germany initially tried to claim that it was the only German state and the East was illegitimate and under the Hallstein Doctrine refused to have relation with any socialist state except the Soviet Union itself.  This policy eventually gave way to Ostpolitik, under which West Germany recognized the East.

Gorbachev gave up on trying to support the deeply unpopular East German government. After the Revolutions of 1989 and the fall of the Berlin Wall, Germany was allowed to reunite by the World War II Allies. The Communist regime in East Germany collapsed and the country became part of West Germany. One issue was the presence of large numbers of Soviet troops; West Germany paid for their repatriation for housing them in the USSR.

Remarkably, despite the two 20th century wars, there are very few hard feelings against Germany in modern Russia, particularly on the part of Russians born after 1945. Moreover, in many places in Russia German war cemeteries were established in places of fierce World War II battles.

Federal Republic of Germany and the Russian Federation

Relations between the two nations since the fall of Communism in 1991 have been generally good but not always without tension.  German chancellor Gerhard Schröder placed high value on relations with Russia and worked for the completion of the Nord Stream 1 gas pipeline between them.  His successor Angela Merkel, an Easterner and former dissident, has been more critical and clashed with Russian president Vladimir Putin over human rights and other issues. However, she, like her predecessor, always put a high value on the Nordstream pipeline, due to its ability to increase Russian influence. Most of the human rights issues could be seen as side-shows for the public - whilst the end-goal was always the completion of, and compensation for, NordStream. The project under both the Bush and Obama administration moved forward at rapid pace, but with only 300 km left, the Trump Administration halted the project by putting pressure on the Danish company overseeing the completion of the pipeline. Germany's relations with Russia were never likely to be as cozy under Angela Merkel as under her predecessor, Gerhard Schröder, who adopted a 3-year-old Russian girl and, on his 60th birthday, invited President Vladimir V. Putin home to celebrate.

Germany created a German-Russian Forum in 1993. Alexandra Gräfin Lambsdorff was its first president.

21st century

Relations were normal in the first part of the new century, with expanding trade relations and an increasing German reliance on pipeline shipments of Russian natural gas. Relations turned highly negative in 2014 in response to Russia's seizure of Crimea from Ukraine and support for insurgents in Ukraine.  Germany was a leader  between  NATO Quint  in imposing round after round of increasingly harsh sanctions against the Russian oil and banking industries and top allies of President Putin. Russia responded by cutting food imports from the EU.

Since the crisis began, Chancellor Angela Merkel told President Putin that the referendum on accession of Crimea to Russia is illegal.

2014-present sanctions

The European Union, the United States and their allies began using economic sanctions to force Russia to reverse course regarding Ukraine and stop supporting 2014 pro-Russian unrest in Ukraine.  The Los Angeles Times reported that:
Merkel and her fellow Western leaders are angered by Russia's actions in Ukraine, especially its seizure of Crimea, support for pro-Russia separatists in eastern Ukraine and fresh military incursion. Moscow's denial that it has any involvement in Ukraine's blood conflict only irks them more. The German chancellor has signaled a tougher stance toward Russia, spelling out her willingness to sacrifice German economic interests and further boost sanctions to send a strong message that Moscow's actions are unacceptable. [She said,] "Being able to change borders in Europe without consequences, and attacking other countries with troops, is in my view a far greater danger than having to accept certain disadvantages for the economy."

On the left, however, former Social Democrat Chancellor Gerhard Schröder announced his understanding of Russian policies and support for Putin. The New York Times editorialized that Schröder's decision to "embrace him [Putin] in a bear hug sent an unacceptable signal that some prominent Europeans are willing to ignore Mr. Putin's brutish ways."  According to the Russian news agency ITAR/TASS, Russia's Prime Minister Dmitry Medvedev admits the sanctions are hurting the Russian economy and slowing its growth. However he expects support oil industries that are hurt, to seek financing and high technology from Asia, and to import food from new sources.

Germany has traditionally been one of Russia's key economic partners. The annual trade turnover between the two countries had exceeded the $80 billion-level just before the sanctions were imposed. It is estimated that mutual sanctions entailed the decline in the bilateral trade volume of up to 20% that meant billions of losses for the German economy and, obviously, many jobs being cut. By early 2014, when the conflict was about to start, not only did German exports to Russia constitute the third of the whole EU's, but more than 6,200 German firms operated in Russia itself. In 2017, for the first time since the introduction of anti-Russian sanctions in 2014, bilateral trade increased - by 22.8%, amounting to about $50 billion. In the first eight months of 2018, the volume of mutual trade between Russia and Germany increased by almost a quarter compared to the same period last year. At the same time, Russian exports to Germany in 2018 increased by 35% to $22.1 billion, while imports rose by 12% to $16.9 billion.

Russians believe their main enemies in the world are the U.S., Ukraine, Poland, Estonia, Latvia and Lithuania, with 62 percent of Russians polled have a poor opinion of the EU, while Germany is rated poorly, according to a Levada Center poll that measures sentiments towards other countries.  Belarus, Kazakhstan, Cuba, China, India and Armenia are Russia's best friends in the world, according to the poll asking which countries do Russians see favorably. Nonetheless, Russians are most hostile towards the United States, with 82 percent of Russians polled picking America as a top-five enemy. Ukraine came second, with 48 percent of those polled believing the country is a foe. Germany, while not rated favorably, is seen with a friendlier attitude by Russians.

A Levada poll released in August 2018 found that 68% of Russian respondents believe that Russia needs to dramatically improve relations with Western countries, including Germany. A Levada poll released in February 2020 found that 80% of Russian respondents believe that Russia and the West should become friends and partners.

The East StratCom Task Force of the European External Action Service registered an increase in false information propagated in Russia about Germany as a result of the deterioration in German-Russian relations developed since the Poisoning of Alexei Navalny.

In October 2021, German Defense Minister Annegret Kramp-Karrenbauer had talked about the possibility of deploying nuclear weapons against Russia. She noted that nuclear weapons are a "means of deterrence."

After the 2022 Russian invasion of Ukraine started, Germany, as one of the EU countries, imposed sanctions on Russia, and Russia added all EU countries to the list of "unfriendly nations". In April 2022, the German government said it will send 1 billion euros in military aid to Ukraine. On 17 May 2022, German Finance Minister Christian Lindner said he is "politically open to the idea of seizing" the frozen foreign-exchange reserves of the Central Bank of Russia —which amount to over $300 billion— to cover the costs of rebuilding Ukraine after the war. Russian Deputy Foreign Minister Alexander Grushko remarked that it would amount to "complete lawlessness", and that the measure would hurt Germany if adopted.

German Riol Chemie GmbH has allegedly illegally delivered chemicals to Russia, including precursor for Novichok.

In late 2022, Germany announced its first trade deficit since 1991, after it halted permits for Nord Stream 2, and introduced a Russian oil embargo. The country has been buckling under an acute energy shortage, approving cost-intensive subsidies to protect households from soaring energy bills. In fall 2022, Russia had halted gas flows via the Nord Stream 1 pipeline several times blaming Western sanctions against Russia, while the value of the Euro continued to slip against all major currencies. Russia's foreign ministry blamed the United States for Germany's energy crisis, by pushing its leaders towards a "suicidal" step of cutting economic and energy cooperation with Moscow, which had been a reliable energy supplier since Soviet times.

The discussion on the legitimacy of economic sanctions against Russia had a significant impact on Germany's political landscape. Parties to the right (AfD) and to the left (Die Linke) are split on the issue whether economic sanctions are effective to stop the conflict, and how they impact the German economy. Proponents of the right wanted to support the Nord Stream 2 pipeline, while politicians to the left have voiced similar concerns with regard to Germany's economic viability.

Russians in Germany

Since German reunification, Germany is home to a fast-growing and large community of people of Russian ancestry who have moved to Germany as full citizens. In the 1990s, some 100,000 to 200,000 arrived annually.  Germany also has funded the communities that remain behind in Russia.

Education
Russian international schools in Germany include the Russian Embassy School in Berlin and the Russian Consulate School in Bonn. There is a German school in Russia: German School Moscow.

Cooperation

Russia regards Germany as its foremost European partner; conversely, Russia is an important trading partner for Germany.
Germany and Russia are cooperating in building the Nord Stream 1 gas pipeline.
Many former East Germans have a good command of the Russian language and considerable knowledge about Russia. The German language is in a firm second place (behind English) at Russian schools. President Putin speaks German at a near-native level, Chancellor Merkel speaks Russian fluently and both leaders also have a strong command of English. On 11 April 2005, a "Joint Declaration on a Strategic Partnership in Education, Research and Innovation" was signed by Chancellor Schröder and President Putin. This accord aims at stepping up bilateral cooperation in the education sector, particularly in training specialist and executive personnel.
Germany has a heavy industry with the size and capacity to modernize infrastructure in Russia. Russia in turn has vast natural resources which are of significant interest to the German economy.
A major success in environment policy is Russia's ratification of the Kyoto Protocol on 27 October 2004, which will also bring economic benefits.
Germany was a strong supporter for Russia's participation in the Group of 8.
 Germany along with France and Russia opposed Ukrainian and Georgian invitations to NATO during NATO's Bucharest summit in 2008. Consequently, NATO did not invite Ukraine and Georgia to MAP (Membership Action Plan).

Embassies

The Embassy of Germany is located in Moscow, Russia. The Embassy of Russia is located in Berlin, Germany.

See also

Russia in the European energy sector
Germany–Soviet Union relations before 1941
Cold War II

References

Further reading

 Berkhoff, Karel C. Harvest of Despair: Life and Death in Ukraine under Nazi Rule (Belknap, 2004)
 Beyrau, Dietrich,  and Mark Keck-Szajbel. "Mortal Embrace: Germans and (Soviet) Russians in the First Half of the 20th Century," Kritika: Explorations in Russian and Eurasian History, Volume 10, Number 3, Summer 2009 pp. 423–439 
 Burleigh, Michael. Germany turns eastwards: a study of Ostforschung in the Third Reich (1988)
 David-Fox, Michael, Peter Holquist, and Alexander M. Martin, eds. Fascination and Enmity: Russia and Germany as Entangled Histories, 1914-1945 (U. of Pittsburgh Press; 2012) 392 pages; considers the perceptions and misperceptions  on both sides
 Dulian, A. "The Molotov-Ribbentrop Pact: Historical Background," International Affairs: A Russian Journal of World Politics, Diplomacy & International Relations, 2009, Vol. 55 Issue 6, pp 181–187
 Dyck, Harvey L. Weimar Germany and Soviet Russia, 1926-1933 (1984)
 Forsberg, Tuomas. "From Ostpolitik to ‘frostpolitik’? Merkel, Putin and German foreign policy towards Russia." International Affairs 92.1 (2016): 21-42 online
 Geyer, Michael, and Sheila Fitzpatrick, eds. Beyond Totalitarianism: Stalinism and Nazism Compared (Cambridge University Press, 2009).
 Haslam, Jonathan. "Soviet-German Relations and the Origins of the Second World War: The Jury is Still Out," Journal of Modern History, 79 (1997), pp. 785–97 in JSTOR
 Jacobs, Jonathan. "Between Westbindung and Ostpolitik: Reconceptualising German-Russian Relations 2014-2017." (2019). online
 Jelavich, Barbara. St. Petersburg and Moscow: tsarist and Soviet foreign policy, 1814-1974 (1974).
 Kuklick, Bruce American Policy and the Division of Germany: The Clash with Russia over Reparations (Cornell U. Press, 1972)
 Laqueur, Walter. Russia and Germany (1965), covers what Russians and Germans thought of each other, 1860–1960.
 Leach, Barry A. German Strategy Against Russia, 1939-41 (Oxford: Clarendon Press, 1973)
 Lieven, Dominic. Russia against Napoleon: the battle for Europe, 1807 to 1814 (2009)
 Liulevicius, Vejas Gabriel. War on the Eastern Front: Culture, National Identity, and German Occupation in World War I (Cambridge University Press, 2000)
 Liulevicius, Vejas Gabriel. The German myth of the East: 1800 to the present (Oxford University Press, 2010)
 Naimark, Norman M. The Russians in Germany: A History of the Soviet Zone of Occupation, 1945-1949 (1997)
 Nekrich, Aleksandr Moiseevich. Pariahs, partners, predators: German-Soviet relations, 1922-1941 (Columbia University Press, 1997).
 Overy, Richard. The Dictators: Hitler's Germany and Stalin's Russia (2005)
 Roberts, Geoffrey. The Soviet Union and the Origins of the Second World War: Russo-German Relations and the Road to War, 1933-41 (1995)
 Salzmann, Stephanie. Great Britain, Germany and the Soviet Union: Rapallo and after, 1922-1934 (2002)
 Schroeder, Paul W. The transformation of European politics, 1763-1848 (1994) detailed diplomatic history covering Prusia and Russia (and the other major powers)
 
 Siddi, Marco. "German foreign policy towards Russia in the aftermath of the Ukraine crisis: A new Ostpolitik?." Europe-Asia Studies 68.4 (2016): 665–677.
 Stent, Angela. Russia and Germany Reborn (2000) on 1990s
Taylor, A.J.P. The Struggle for Master in Europe: 1848-1918 (1954), a broad overview of the diplomacy of all the major powers
 Uldricks, Teddy J. "War, Politics and Memory: Russian Historians Reevaluate the Origins of World War II," History and Memory 21#2 (2009), pp. 60–2 online; historiography
 Watt, Donald Cameron. How War Came: The Immediate Origins of the Second World War; 1938-1939 (1989), pp. 361–84, 447–61.
 Weinberg, Gerhard L. Germany and the Soviet Union 1939-1941 (1972)
 Williamson, Jr., Samuel R. and Ernest R. May. "An Identity of Opinion: Historians and July 1914," Journal of Modern History, June 2007, Vol. 79 Issue 2, pp 335–387 in JSTOR
 Yoder, Jennifer A. "From Amity to Enmity: German-Russian Relations in the Post Cold War Period." German Politics & Society 33#3 (2015): 49–69.

External links

Petersburger Dialogue (in German and Russian only)
Bergedorfer Round Table

 
Russia
Bilateral relations of Russia